Michal Škoda (born 3 January 1988 in Prague) is a Czech football player who currently plays for SK Dynamo České Budějovice. He is younger brother of Milan Škoda.

References

External links

Profile at FC Zbrojovka Brno official site

1988 births
Living people
Footballers from Prague
Czech footballers
Czech First League players
FK Bohemians Prague (Střížkov) players
FC Zbrojovka Brno players
FK Viktoria Žižkov players
Lillestrøm SK players
1. FK Příbram players
SK Líšeň players
Eliteserien players
Czech expatriate footballers
Expatriate footballers in Norway
Czech expatriate sportspeople in Norway
Association football forwards
SK Dynamo České Budějovice players
FK Mladá Boleslav players